is a railway station on the Hisatsu Line and Kitto Line in Yūsui, Aira District, Kagoshima, Japan, operated by Kyushu Railway Company (JR Kyushu). The station opened in 1903.

Lines
Yoshimatsu Station is served by the Hisatsu Line. It is also a terminus of the Kitto Line.

Adjacent stations

Surrounding area
Yoshimatsu Post office
Yūsui Town Hall Yoshimatsu Branch

Yūsui Town Yoshimatsu Elementary School
Yūsui Town Yoshimatsu Junior High School
Kyūshū Expressway Yoshimatsu Parking Area
Kagoshima Prison

See also
 List of railway stations in Japan

External links

  

Railway stations in Japan opened in 1903
Railway stations in Kagoshima Prefecture
Yūsui, Kagoshima